Riccardo Cucciolla (5 September 1924 – 17 September 1999) was an Italian actor and voice actor. He appeared in 60 films between 1953 and 1999. He won the Best Actor Award at the 1971 Cannes Film Festival for the film Sacco & Vanzetti.

Biography 
Born in Bari, in southern Italy, Cucciolla gained a degree in law, then made his stage debut in an amateur production in his home city. From 1946, he started working in radio as a voice actor and as the narrator of documentaries; at the same time, he started working in cinema, as a dubber and a voice actor.

Cucciolla made his film debut in 1953, in Anton Giulio Majano's Good Folk's Sunday. After some minor roles, he had his first important role in Italiani brava gente (1965), followed by a further significant role in Giuliano Montaldo's Grand Slam (1967).

Cucciolla came to national and international recognition with the leading role in Montaldo's Sacco e Vanzetti, for which he was awarded best actor at Cannes and won a Silver Ribbon. In the wake of that sudden popularity, he intensively worked throughout the decade, alternating notable films with others of more modest quality and ambition. Starting from eighties he thinned out his appearances, mainly focusing on dubbing and television roles. As a dubber, he provided voice-overs for Roger Moore, Claudio Villa, Erland Josephson, John Cazale, Jonathan Pryce, Richard Egan, James Caan, Robert Duvall and more.

On 17 September 1999, Cucciolla died in Rome at the age of 75. He is survived by his wife, the poet Alida Sessa; their son Riccardo; and two children by his first wife, Francesco and Lietta.

Selected filmography

 Good Folk's Sunday (1953) - Cesco
 I Vitelloni (1953) - Narrator (voice, uncredited)
 Il seduttore (1954) - Racca
 Il piccolo vetraio (1955) - (voice)
 Rascel-Fifì (1957) - Undici
 Silver Spoon Set (1960) - Anselmo Foresi (voice, uncredited)
 Love in Rome (1960) - Narrator (uncredited)
 Primitive Love (1964) - Narrator (uncredited)
 Attack and Retreat (1964) - Sanna
 La bugiarda (1965)
 Grand Slam (1967) - Agostino Rossi
 The Seven Cervi Brothers (1968) - Gelindo Cervi
 Bandits in Rome (1968) - Vice Commissioner Pascuttini
 La rivoluzione sessuale (1968) - Emilio Missiroli
 Una sull'altra (1969) - Benjamin Wormser
 Giacomo Casanova: Childhood and Adolescence (1969) - Narratore (voice, uncredited)
 Sacco e Vanzetti (1971) - Nicola Sacco
 The Case Is Closed, Forget It (1971) - Pesenti
 We Are All in Temporary Liberty (1971) - Mario De Rossi
 The Sicilian Checkmate (1972) - Professor Salemi
 Un apprezzato professionista di sicuro avvenire (1972) - Nicola Perella
 Un flic (1972) - Paul Weber
 Incensurato provata disonestà carriera assicurata cercasi (1972) - Commissario
 The Assassination of Matteotti (1973) - Antonio Gramsci
 No, The Case Is Happily Resolved (1973) - Professor Eduardo Ranieri
 Paolo il caldo (1973) - Paolo's Father
 24 ore... non un minuto di più (1973) - Minister Handras
 The Sensual Man (1974) - Celio D'Altamura
 Le Hasard et la Violence (1974) - Dr. Puget (uncredited)
 The Visitor (1974)
 Borsalino & Co. (1974) - Volpone
 Rabid Dogs (1974) - Riccardo
 The Last Day of School Before Christmas (1975) - Ambro
 C.I.A. Secret Story (1975) - Giuseppe Pinelli
  (1975) - Olivares
 Il fratello (1975)
 La linea del fiume (1976) - Dr. Roder
 Take All of Me (1976) - Padre di Stella
 Meet Him and Die (1976) - Commissioner Sacchi
 Antonio Gramsci: The Days of Prison (1977) - Antonio Gramsci
 Turi and the Paladins (1979) - Don Saverio
 Il ragazzo di Ebalus (1984) - Old farmer
 The Assisi Underground (1985) - Luigi Brizzi
 Una casa in bilico (1986) - Teodoro detto Teo
 Il coraggio di parlare (1987) - Don Carmelo Fiorillo
 Remake (1987) - Himself
 32 dicembre (1988) - Anselmi, lo spasimante (segment "La gialla farfalla")
 Il segreto dell'uomo solitario (1988)
 Vanille fraise (1989) - Andreani
  (1991) - Massimo Serboli
 In Calabria (1993) - Narrator (voice)
 L'Affaire (1994) - Van Doude
 La voce del cuore (1995, TV Mini-Series) - Antonio
 Lucky Punch (1996) - Zipolino
  (1997) - The Monk

Dubbing roles

Live action
Fredo Corleone in The Godfather
Fredo Corleone in The Godfather Part II
Alexander in The Sacrifice
Judge Cancedda in I Am Afraid
Elliot Carver in Tomorrow Never Dies
Lee Stegler in Countdown
Mr. Hillyer in Rambling Rose

References

Further reading
  Vito Attolini, Alfonso Marrese. Riccardo Cucciolla. Ritratto di attore. Edizioni Dal Sud, 1990. .

External links

1924 births
1999 deaths
People from Bari
Italian male film actors
Italian male television actors
Italian male voice actors
Italian male stage actors
Italian male radio actors
Italian voice directors
Cannes Film Festival Award for Best Actor winners
Nastro d'Argento winners
20th-century Italian male actors